The strongest man in the world may refer to:

Artie, the Strongest Man in the World, a character from The Adventures of Pete & Pete
The Strongest Man in the World, a 1975 Disney film
Zishe Breitbart, a Polish-born circus performer, known as "Strongest Man in the World"
World's Strongest Man, a well-known competition event in strength athletics